The Gulf of Guayaquil–Tumbes mangroves (NT1413) are an ecoregion located in the Gulf of Guayaquil in South America, in northern Peru and southern Ecuador. It has an area of 3,300 km² (1300 sq mi).

Location
The mangroves are found between Ecuador and Peru where many rivers empty into the Pacific and the Gulf of Guayaquil.
They fringe the Gulf of Guayaquil and the northwestern Pacific Coast of Peru near Tumbes.
Inland the mangroves transition into areas of Ecuadorian dry forests, Western Ecuador moist forests and in the south the Tumbes–Piura dry forests, which extend into Peru.

The Gulf of Guayaquil is the largest estuary ecosystem on South America's Pacific coast.
The flat land and high tides result in salt water moving far up the gulf.

Ecology

The ecoregion is part of the Panama Bight Mangroves, a Global ecoregion, which contains the Gulf of Panama mangroves, Esmeraldas–Pacific Colombia mangroves, Manabí mangroves and Gulf of Guayaquil–Tumbes mangroves.

Flora

The ecoregion contains plant formations of mangrove (Rhizophora spp.) forest that are adapted to permanently flooded conditions and the resulting environments, which offer little available oxygen. 

The Tumbes River is the southern limit for some mangrove species.

Fauna

There 13 mammal and reptile species, including the American crocodile (Crocodylus acutus) at its southern limit.
There are more than 40 species of birds including the Neotropic cormorant (Phalacrocorax brasilianus), white-necked heron (Ardea pacifica), great egret (Ardea alba), American white ibis (Eudocimus albus), roseate spoonbill (Platalea ajaja), osprey (Pandion haliaetus), white-winged guan (Penelope albipennis) and horned screamer (Anhima cornuta).

Status

Large parts of the mangroves have been destroyed to make way for aquaculture, rice farms, housing and industry.
Other threats come from mercury pollution from gold and silver mining upstream in the Puyango-Tumbes watershed, urban pollution and dams.
Since then the mangroves have been slowly recovering, and seem stable.

On Ecuador's side of the mangrove ecoregion, particularly near the cities of Machala and Santa Rosa in the province of El Oro, many shrimp farm ponds have been dug out for export of shrimp to the U.S., Europe and other regions. Shrimp are one of Ecuador's main exports together with crude oil and derivatives, bananas and ornamental flowers.

On the Peruvian side some of the mangroves are protected by the Manglares de Tumbes National Sanctuary.

Notes

Sources

Mangrove ecoregions
Ecoregions of Peru
Ecoregions of Ecuador
Natural history of Peru
Natural history of Ecuador
 
 
Neotropical ecoregions
Ramsar sites in Peru
Tropical Eastern Pacific